Guará is a municipality situated in the northern part of the state of São Paulo in Brazil. The population is 21,308 (2020 est.) in an area of 362 km2. The elevation is 573 m.

This place name comes from the Tupi language for two animals common in the region, the maned wolf (Chrysocyon brachyurus) and the scarlet ibis (Eudocimus ruber).

References

External links 
 

Municipalities in São Paulo (state)